Isha Chawla (born  6 March 1988) is an Indian actress who has primarily appeared in Telugu    

films. She made her debut with Prema Kavali (2012).

Early life 
Isha Chawla was born on 6 March 1988 in Delhi. She graduated in Political Science and joined a theatre group in Mumbai to pursue a career in acting.

Career 
Chawla made her film debut with Prema Kavali opposite debutant Aadi under K. Vijaya Bhaskar's direction. She went on to star in  Poola Rangadu and Srimannarayana opposite Nandamuri Balakrishna. In 2013, she starred in  Mr. Pellikoduku, the remake of Tanu Weds Manu (2011). She starred in Jump Jilani (2014) before making her Kannada debut opposite Darshan in Viraat (2016). She had also worked on M. S. Raju's  Rambha Urvasi Menaka starring Trisha and Nikesha Patel; however, the film was later shelved.

Filmography
All films are in Telugu, unless otherwise noted.

References

External links
 

Living people
Actresses in Telugu cinema
Actresses in Kannada cinema
1988 births
21st-century Indian actresses
Indian film actresses
Actresses from Delhi